Daniele Donnarumma (born 12 April 1992) is an Italian football player. He plays for Cittadella.

Club career
He made his Serie B debut for Nocerina on 1 November 2011 in a game against Empoli.

On 27 August 2020, after 8 years between Serie C and Serie D, he came back to Serie B by signing for Cittadella.

References

External links
 

1992 births
Sportspeople from the Province of Naples
Living people
Italian footballers
S.S.C. Napoli players
A.S.G. Nocerina players
A.C. Carpi players
Como 1907 players
A.S.D. Barletta 1922 players
A.C.R. Messina players
Cavese 1919 players
Calcio Lecco 1912 players
Mantova 1911 players
S.S. Monopoli 1966 players
A.S. Cittadella players
Serie B players
Serie C players
Serie D players
Association football defenders
Footballers from Campania